Jolsobi (End of Spring) is an Assamese language film directed and written by debutant independent filmmaker Jaicheng Jai Dohutia and produced by Mayamara Productions in association with Arman Productions, FunDeMental Studios and Mogador Film. The film is based on gender equality a massive issue and a worldwide injustice.

Plot 
Tapashi (Darathie Bharadwaj), a young college grad, the protagonist of the film tries to hold a job; she even tries to salvage her relationship with a man who doesn't feel the same way about her while attempting to make it big in a small village that restricts her and barely allows her freedom of choice but none of it is ever sufficient.

Cast 

 Darathie Bharadwaj
 Numal Chandra Gogoi
 Durlabha Moran
 Dulukanta Moran
 Akhil Bihiya Gogoi
 Biponjit Gogoi
 Karabi Dowarah
 Bishal Anurag
 Geetashree Dohutia
 Rashmi Rekha Dohutia

Production 
Jolsobi is an Indo-German production. It has been made by Mayamara Art & Culture in association with Mogador Film Berlin, Fundamental Studios Frankfurt and Arman Productions India. Dohutia wrote the script in 2020.

Awards

References

External links
 
 

2021 films
Assamese-language films